The 1979 Amco Cup was the 6th edition of the NSWRFL Midweek Cup, a NSWRFL-organised national club Rugby League tournament between the leading clubs and representative teams from the NSWRFL, the BRL, the CRL, the QRL and the NZRL.

A total of 16 teams from across Australia and New Zealand played 27 matches in a round-robin group format with the winners of each group advancing to a knockout stage, with the matches being held midweek during the premiership season.

Qualified Teams

Venues

Group A

Group B

Group C

Group D

Semi finals

Final

Player of the Series
 Kurt Sorensen (Cronulla-Sutherland)

Golden Try
 Robert Laurie (South Sydney)

Sources

1979
1979 in Australian rugby league
1979 in New Zealand rugby league